Loma is an unincorporated community in Butler County, Nebraska,  United States. As of the 2000 census, the community had a population of 54.

History
Loma was named by the railroad, and it is possibly derived from a Spanish name meaning "little hill".

Geography
Loma is located at  (41.12981, -96.94379).

Demographics
As of the census of 2000, there were 54 people, 18 households, and 13 families residing in the community. There are 20 housing units. The racial makeup of the community was 100.00% White.

In the media
Loma was featured in the 1995 comedy film To Wong Foo, Thanks for Everything! Julie Newmar as the fictional village of Snydersville, Nebraska.

Loma, Nebraska, is mentioned in the film An Unfinished Life (2005).

References

Czech-American culture in Nebraska
Unincorporated communities in Butler County, Nebraska
Unincorporated communities in Nebraska